Bolboschoenus is a genus of plants in the sedge family, of nearly cosmopolitan distribution. Epipaleolithic and Neolithic peoples used ground root tubers of these plants to make the first breads.

 Accepted species
 Bolboschoenus caldwellii (V.J.Cook) Soják - Australia, New Zealand
 Bolboschoenus capensis (Burm.f.) Holub - Cape Province of South Africa
 Bolboschoenus fluviatilis (Torr.) Soják - Australia, New Zealand, New Caledonia, Canada, United States, northeastern Mexico
 Bolboschoenus glaucus (Lam.) S.G.Sm. - southern Europe, Africa, Middle East, Central Asia, India, Mongolia
 Bolboschoenus grandispicus (Steud.) Lewej. & Lobin - coastal dunes in Senegal
 Bolboschoenus laticarpus Marhold, Hroudová, Ducháček & Zákr - central Europe from Britain and France to Ukraine; Algeria, Turkey
 Bolboschoenus maritimus (L.) Palla in W.D.J.Koch - widespread across much of temperate and subtropical Europe, Africa, Asia, North America, South America and various islands
 Bolboschoenus medianus (V.J.Cook) Soják - Australia, New Zealand
 Bolboschoenus nobilis (Ridl.) Goetgh. & D.A.Simpson - Angola, Namibia
 Bolboschoenus novae-angliae (Britton) S.G.Sm. - northeastern United States from Maine south along the seacoast to Georgia
 Bolboschoenus planiculmis (F.Schmidt) T.V.Egorova - much of Europe and Asia from Spain to Japan and south to New Guinea
 Bolboschoenus robustus (Pursh) Soják - eastern United States; California, Bermuda, Bahamas, east coast of Mexico (from Tamaulipas to Tabasco), New Brunswick, northern South America
 Bolboschoenus schmidii (Raymond) Holub - Iran, Central Asia
 Bolboschoenus stagnicola (Raymond) Soják. - Pakistan
 Bolboschoenus yagara (Ohwi) Y.C.Yang & M.Zhan - northern Eurasia from Germany and Sweden to Japan and Kamchatka, including Russia, Siberia, China

References

 
Cyperaceae genera
Taxa named by Paul Friedrich August Ascherson
Taxa named by Eduard Palla